The Folsom City Zoo Sanctuary (originally Folsom Zoo) is a zoo and animal sanctuary located in the city of Folsom, California, in the United States, which has been open since 1963. The facility differs from traditional zoos and is more like a sanctuary in the way the animals are acquired and the care they receive. Though the facility allows visitors like a traditional zoo, the animals are not bred, sold, or traded.

The Folsom City Zoo Sanctuary is supported by Friends of the Folsom Zoo, a 501(c)(3) non-profit organization which helps by providing both funding and volunteers.

History

The zoo took in its first animal in 1963, when the University of California at Davis Veterinary Department asked the Folsom Park superintendent to add an orphaned bear cub to the few animals he had been keeping around the park office. A cage was built for the bear, Smokey joined the other animals, and the Folsom Zoo was born.

The name was changed to Folsom City Zoo Sanctuary in 2002 to better describe the zoo's goal of taking in animals that cannot be released back to the wild. The animals at the zoo belonged to private parties who either had them seized or relinquished them, wild animals that have injuries that would prevent them from being released back into the wild, and wild animals that have been captured due to their interactions with humans. Once in the zoo, the animals are generally not bred, sold, or traded; but are cared for until they die.

Animals at the zoo

Many, but not all, of the zoo residents are native to North America. Animals at the zoo include bears, tigers, mountain lions, bobcats, foxes, wolves, wolf hybrids, coyote, sheep, mule deer, macaques, squirrel monkeys, raccoons, skunks, eagles, parrots, and ravens.

In 2004, the zoo took in two tigers from a Riverside County, CA facility called "Tiger Rescue", where more than 90 dead tigers were found, and other exotic animals were existing in illegal conditions. The owner of Tiger Rescue, John Weinhart, was convicted on 56 felonies of child and animal abuse.

References

External links

Official site for Friends of the Folsom Zoo Sanctuary

Zoos in California
Animal sanctuaries
Folsom, California
Organizations established in 1963
Buildings and structures in Sacramento County, California
Tourist attractions in Sacramento County, California
Zoos established in 1963
1963 establishments in California